Listaku may refer to several places in Estonia:
Listaku, Rõuge Parish, village in Võru County, Estonia
Listaku, Võru Parish, village in Võru County, Estonia